This article contains a list of U.S. states and the District of Columbia by median home price, according to data from Zillow and Business Insider.

List U.S. states and D.C. by median home price

See also
 Cost of rent by state and county in the United States

References 

home price
home price
United states, home price